Norman Peter Leete Wildy (31 March 1920 – 10 March 1987) was a 20th-century British virologist who was an expert on the herpes simplex virus.

Education and personal life

He was born in Tunbridge Wells in Kent on 31 March 1920 the son of Eric Lawrence Wildy (1890–1973) an electrical engineer, and his wife, Gwendolen Leete (1890–1982). He was educated at Eastbourne College. He studied Medicine at Cambridge University graduating MB ChB, and completed his medical training at St Thomas Hospital, London. In 1945 he married Joan Audrey Kenion. They had a son and two daughters.

He was called up and did his National Service as a medical officer with the Kings West African Rifles, serving in Nigeria, India and Egypt.
 
On his return he worked as a house officer at Greenbank Hospital, Plymouth. Housing was in short supply, so he bought Happy Medium, a retired RAF air-sea rescue launch, which was moored initially on the Cornish side of the Tamar. When he obtained a fellowship at St Thomas's Hospital in London, he sailed the Happy Medium to the more convenient location of Shoreham-by-Sea, near Brighton.

In the early 1950s he achieved a two-year Exchange Fellowship to the University of Melbourne, Australia.

He could play the flute and piccolo, kept Black Welsh Mountain Sheep, and was able to spin and dye wool, was a competent carpenter (he built his own spinning wheel) and capable of other practical activities such re-roofing a barn and re-building rooms in his house.

He died of lung cancer on 10 March 1987 at Cotton Hall in Kedington in Suffolk.

Scientific career
He obtained a research post at the Research Laboratory at St Thomas's Hospital in London, working as a bacteriologist, and was appointed to a lectureship in 1952 and senior lectureship in 1957. During this time he became interested in virology and managed to spend time working with Sir MacFarlane Burnet at the Walter and Eliza Hall Institute in Melbourne, Australia. It was there that he started work on herpes.

He subsequently was at the Department of Pathology at University of Cambridge where he worked on herpes simplex virus and met Michael Stoker, who would have a significant impact on his career. During his brief time at University of Cambridge he worked with Sydney Brenner and Bob Horne, a leading electron microscopist, to use negative staining to see details of viral structure for the first time. This led him into viral classification, an important area of his work for the rest of his life. Proposals for viral classification that he made with collaborators became the basis for an international system. He was subsequently the first chair of the International Committee for the Taxonomy of Viruses.

By 1959 he was brought to the new Medical Research Council (Experimental Virology Unit) in Glasgow by Michael Stoker, its founding director. Wildy was the assistant director. In 1962 he was elected a Fellow of the Royal Society of Edinburgh. His proposers were Guido Pontecorvo, Michael Stoker, Sir William Weipers and Sir Michael Swann.

From 1963 to 1975 he was Professor of Virology and Bacteriology at Birmingham University, introducing a specialised MSc programme in virology. During this time he was also involved in the foundation of the Journal of General Virology, that commenced publication in 1967 and was the journal's first editor. He was also one of the four founders of the International Congress of Virology, first held in Helsinki in 1968.

In 1975 he was appointed to the Chair of Pathology at the University of Cambridge and remained there until 1987. During this time part of his department moved to a site three miles away at Addenbrooke. He also became a Fellow of Gonville and Caius College.

He was president of the Society for General Microbiology from 1978 to 1981 and an Honorary Member from 1986.

During his career he was a member of very many committees including the board of the Public Health Laboratory Service, an adviser to the World Health Organization and the governing bodies of several research council institutes.

Publications

What's in a Virus Name? (1966)
 Andrewes, C. ; Pereira, H. G. ; Wildy, P. Viruses of vertebrates (1978, 4th edition), Bailliere Tyndall, London
Wildy P. Herpes: History and Classification. Kaplan A.S. (Ed.), The Herpesviruses, Academic Press, New York (1973), pp. 1–26.

Legacy
The annual Peter Wildy Prize Lecture in microbiology education or communication is named after him.

Gonville and Caius College, Cambridge award an annual Wildy Student scholarship in virology.

Peter Wildy Prize Lecturers
This Prize lecture was introduced in 2001 by the Microbiology Society for communication of microbiology in education and to the public.
Iruka N Okeke (2023)
Elisabeth Bik (2021)
Laura Bowater (2019)
Tansy Hammarton (2018)
Wendy Barclay (2016)
Simon Park (2015)
Stephen Curry (2014)
David Bhella (2013)
Vincent Racaniello (2012)
Anthony C. Hilton (2011)
Sue Assinder (2010)
Chris Smith (2008)
R. E. Sockett (2006)
Joanna Verran (2005)
Nicholas Thomson (2004)
R. A. Killington (2003)
Alan J. Cann (2001)

References

1920 births
1987 deaths
People from Royal Tunbridge Wells
People educated at Eastbourne College
Alumni of the University of Cambridge
Academics of the University of Cambridge
Fellows of the Royal Society of Edinburgh
British virologists